Patricia Jones may refer to:

Patricia Jones (sprinter) (1930–2000), Canadian athlete who competed mainly in the 100 metres
Patricia Darcy Jones (1953–2007), American rock singer, vocalist and Broadway actor
Patricia Spears Jones (born 1951), American poet
Patricia W. Jones (born 1950), American politician from Utah
Patricia Egan Jones, American politician in the New Jersey General Assembly

See also
Pat Jones (disambiguation)